Alex Creek is a stream in the U.S. state of Georgia. It is a tributary to the Altamaha River.

A variant name is "Alecks Creek". Alex Creek was named after "Captain" Alleck, a Lower Creek chieftain.

References

Rivers of Georgia (U.S. state)
Rivers of Wayne County, Georgia